Nakuul Mehta (born 17 January 1983) is an Indian actor who primarily works in Hindi television. He made his acting debut in 2012 with Pyaar Ka Dard Hai Meetha Meetha Pyaara Pyaara portraying Aditya Kumar. He earned wider recognition with his portrayal of Shivaay Singh Oberoi in Ishqbaaz and Ram Kapoor in Bade Achhe Lagte Hain 2. 

Mehta made his web debut in 2016 with I Don't Watch TV. He is also known for his role in the web series Never Kiss Your Best Friend, Zindagi in Short and in the short film Ved and Arya.

Early life
Nakuul Mehta's family hails from Udaipur, Rajasthan. His father, Pratap Singh Mehta, is a veteran of the Indo-Pakistani War of 1971, while his great-great grandfather Laxmilal Mehta was the military commander of the Mewar region.

Mehta completed his Master of Commerce from Mumbai University. He was also trained in dance forms including jazz, hip hop, break, folk, salsa and contemporary. He is a trained ballroom dancer having learned under India's foremost ballroom teacher and Bollywood choreographer Sandip Soparrkar. He represented Maharashtra in the All India Dance Sport Federation in June 2011. He was a silver medalist in the Latin Ballroom Category and is a gold medal winner in the Standard Ballroom category.

Personal life

Mehta married singer Jankee Parekh on 28 January 2012. The couple had their first child on 3 February 2021, a boy, Sufi.

Health
In June 2022, Mehta was hospitalised for 2 days in Sujoy Hospital in Juhu, Mumbai, with appendicitis.  Mehta, underwent appendectomy, a minor surgery, and had his appendix removed.

Career

Debut and early career (2012-2015)
Mehta  made his television debut in 2012 with the role of Aditya Kumar in Star Plus's Pyaar Ka Dard Hai Meetha Meetha Pyaara Pyaara. He received praises for his role and the show had good TRP run.

He did commercials, music videos, and was associated with theatre for a long time. After juggling this with his modelling career, he made his film debut with a Telugu film,  Indian Beauty. Later he played the character of Shekhar in Haal-e-Dil opposite Amita Pathak. He also appeared in the short film Avant Garde, which was showcased at film festivals across the globe. In 2015, Mehta hosted India's Got Talent 6.

He was then seen in the web-series I Don't Watch TV, published on the platform Arre produced by Timbuktu Films. It is a satire on the Indian television industry and also stars Bollywood film critic Rajeev Masand.

Breakthrough and success (2016-Present)
Mehta had his breakthrough with the role of Shivaay Singh Oberoi in Ishqbaaaz. Mehta also appeared in the show's spin-off, Dil Boley Oberoi. Just like his previous show, it also gained high TRPs and established him as a leading actor in Indian Television Industry. It was the biggest hit of his television career. 

He then appeared in short film called Ved and Arya in March 2020, where he played character Ved opposite  Sanaya Irani.

He recently did an album on 12 poems named Poems For Democracy in collaboration with Ajay Singh and the same was released on Kommune, a platform for artists.

Nakuul made his web debut with Never Kiss Your Best Friend and later played Shyam in BAE Control. He also took part in the web series named  Zindagi in Short  an anthology of seven stories in which he  appeared on the third episode Sunny Side Upar as Vishal opposite Rima Kallingal which was first released on Flipkart Video and later on Netflix.

Since August 2021, he is playing the role of Ram Virendar Kapoor in Bade Achhe Lagte Hain 2, opposite his previous Co-actor Disha Parmar. Nakuul is receiving immense acclaim for his role as Ram. Mehta was also dubbed in the Hindi version of Free Guy as the Guy (Blue Shirt Guy).

Filmography

Television

Films
All films are in Hindi unless otherwise noted.

Web series

Voice artist

Awards and nominations

References

External links
 
 
 

1983 births
Living people
Rajasthani people
Indian male models
Indian male television actors
Male actors from Rajasthan
Male actors in Hindi television
Indian male soap opera actors
Indian male film actors
People from Udaipur
Male actors in Telugu cinema